Gliocladiopsis tenuis is a fungal plant pathogen. It is found in Vietnam.

References

Nectriaceae
Fungal plant pathogens and diseases
Fungi of Asia
Fungi described in 1939